Sir William Douglas, 2nd Baronet may refer to:
Sir William Douglas, 2nd Baronet of Glenbervie, (died c. 1680), see Douglas Baronets#Douglas of Glenbervie (1625) 
Sir William Douglas, 2nd Baronet of Kelhead (c. 1675–1733), see Douglas Baronets#Douglas of Kelhead (1668) 
Admiral Sir William Henry Douglas, 2nd Baronet of Carr (died 1809), see Douglas Baronets#Douglas of Carr (1777)

See also
Douglas Baronets
William Douglas (disambiguation)